George W. Edwards (born April 30, 1939) was the sixteenth president of Kansas City Southern Railway.

References
 Kansas City Southern Historical Society, The Kansas City Southern Lines. Retrieved August 15, 2005.

1939 births
20th-century American railroad executives
Kansas City Southern Railway
Living people
20th-century American businesspeople